Ungaliophis continentalis, or the Chiapan boa, is a species of nonvenomous snake in the family Tropidophiidae. It is endemic to Mexico, Guatemala, and Honduras.

References

Tropidophiidae
Reptiles described in 1880
Reptiles of Mexico
Reptiles of Guatemala
Reptiles of Honduras
Snakes of Central America